Broadfield is a small village south of Saundersfoot in the parish and community of St Mary Out Liberty in Pembrokeshire, Wales.

References

External links
Historical information and links on GENUKI

Villages in Pembrokeshire